Nemophora topazias is a moth of the Adelidae family. It is found in the Australian Capital Territory, New South Wales, Queensland, South Australia and Tasmania.

The larvae feed on the flowers of Acacia baileyana. It constructs an ovate, portable case of flower fragments in the leaf litter beneath the host plant.

External links
Australian Faunal Directory
Image at CSIRO Entomology
Moths of Australia

Moths of Australia
Adelidae
Moths described in 1893